Niccolò I Ludovisi (1610 – 25 December 1664) was Prince of Piombino from 1634 until his death, along his military and diplomatic career he was known and recorded in historical documents as Commander Niccolò da Candia, for his engagement in the Venetian colony of Crete, the Duchy of Candia

Family

He was the son of Orazio Ludovisi, patrician of Bologna and commander-in-chief of the Papal Army (as well as brother of Pope Gregory XV), and Lavinia Albergati. He was the nephew of later-Cardinal Niccolò Albergati-Ludovisi. He was a brother of Ludovico Ludovisi who was made a cardinal by their uncle the pope.

Marriages and legacy

Ludovisi was married three times.

He married firstly on 30 November 1622 to Isabella Gesualdo (1611–1629), princess of Venosa,
Lavinia (1627–1634), died in childhood

In 1632 Niccolò married secondly to Polissena Appiani (?-1642), the daughter and heiress of Isabella Appiani, Princess of Piombino.
Gregorio Filippo (1633-c.1637), died in childhood

His third marriage in 1644 was to Costanza Pamphili (1627–1665), niece of Pope Innocent X and the sister of Camillo Pamphili who married Ludovisi's niece, Olimpia Aldobrandini.
 Giovan Battista (1647–1699), Prince of Piombino from 1664
 Olimpia (1656–1700), Princess of Piombino (1700), unmarried
 Lavinia (1659–1682), married Giangirolamo, Duke of Atri but had no issue
 Ippolita (1663–1733), Princess of Piombino (1700–1733), married Gregorio II Boncompagni and had issue
 Niccolo (c.1664-1665), died in infancy

Niccolò Ludovisi died at Cagliari, and was succeeded in his state by his son Giovan Battista Ludovisi.

Titles

After his participation in the Ottoman-Venetian war of Crete,  Niccolò was greatly financially compensated for his involvement as Commander and Admiral, becoming known as Commander Niccolò da Candia, and eventually recognized by the noble title of Prince in 1634 after paying the large amount of one million gold florins. After all, he also inherited his father's titles, becoming marquis of Populonia and duke of Fiano.

Then under the Spanish Crown, he became Spanish Viceroy in Aragon (1660–1662) and Sardinia (1662–1664), and in 1657 he was named a Knight of the Order of the Golden Fleece.

References

Literature
Klaus Jaitner, Die Hauptinstruktionen Gregors XV.: Für die Nuntien und Gesandten an den europäischen Fürstenhöfen, 1621-1623, Bibliothek des Deutsches Historisches Institut in Rom, Max Niemeyer Verlag, 1997, pp. 167–178. , 

Ludovisi, Niccolo 1
Ludovisi, Niccolo 1
Ludovisi, Niccolo 1
Niccolo 1
17th-century Italian nobility